KLCQ may refer to:

 KLCQ (FM), a radio station (88.5 FM) licensed to serve Durango, Colorado, United States
 Lake City Gateway Airport (ICAO code KLCQ)